

See also

Individuals
 List of wealthiest historical figures
 Forbes list of billionaires
 List of wealthiest families
 List of wealthiest animals

Businesses
 List of largest church buildings
 List of largest companies by revenue
 List of largest employers
 List of largest corporate profits and losses
 List of public corporations by market capitalization
 List of most indebted companies
 List of largest manufacturing companies by revenue
 List of largest financial services companies by revenue
 List of largest European companies by revenue
 List of top earning travel companies

References
  

Lists of companies
Economy-related lists of superlatives